"In These Arms" is a song by American rock band Bon Jovi. The song was written by Jon Bon Jovi, Richie Sambora and David Bryan. It was released on May 3, 1993, as the third single from the band's fifth studio album, Keep the Faith (1992).

Song information 
The song's lyrics are about everlasting love and devotion. The song is characterized by a strong bass rhythm, jangling guitars, and very tight, hard drum playing, as well as soulful, emotional singing by Jon Bon Jovi. However, it is not a ballad, as its driving guitars and fast-paced beat and upbeat sound maintain it as more of a pop-rock song, in the vein of "Born to Be My Baby".

Music video 
The video for the song shows Bon Jovi performing at a concert on their Keep the Faith Tour. The live portions were filmed during Bon Jovi's New Year's Eve show at Stabler Arena in Bethlehem, Pennsylvania on December 31, 1992. The live show was also featured on their previous track "Bed of Roses". Portions of the video were also filmed at the Dane County Coliseum in Madison, Wisconsin in March 1993.

Legacy 
The song has always been a fan favorite, and was a staple in the band's setlist on their Have A Nice Day Tour, and also was played frequently on the Lost Highway Tour, especially on the European leg of the tour. The song was also recorded by the band's keyboard player David Bryan on his first solo album On a Full Moon released in 1995, with him singing vocals, and also appears on his second solo album Lunar Eclipse released in 2000.

Track listing 
UK release
 "In These Arms"
 "Keep the Faith" (live)
 "In These Arms" (live)

Chart performance 
"In These Arms" was Bon Jovi's second-most successful single from Keep the Faith in the United States, reaching number 27 on the Billboard Hot 100, number 32 on the Billboard Mainstream Rock chart, and number 14 on the Billboard Mainstream Top 40. It also reached number five in Iceland, number six in Canada, number seven in the Netherlands, number nine in the United Kingdom, and number 10 in Australia and Portugal.

Weekly charts

Year-end charts

References 

1992 songs
1993 singles
Bon Jovi songs
Mercury Records singles
Music videos directed by Wayne Isham
Song recordings produced by Bob Rock
Songs written by Jon Bon Jovi
Songs written by Richie Sambora
Songs written by David Bryan